California Water Fix and Eco Restore, formerly known as the Bay Delta Conservation Plan, is  a $15 billion plan proposed by Governor Jerry Brown and the California Department of Water Resources to build two large, four-story tall tunnels to carry fresh water from the Sacramento River under the Sacramento-San Joaquin Delta toward the intake stations for the State Water Project and the Central Valley Project.

The tunnel project is as big or bigger than the  English Channel Tunnel and Boston's Big Dig. The project would also include three new intakes with a capacity of 9000 cubic feet per second (approx. 255 kilolitres per second) each, and a total annual yield of 4.9 million acre-feet. The proposed cost for the tunnels is $15 billion, with $8 billion additional devoted to habitat restoration. The project was to be funded by revenue bonds created by the agencies who benefit, and paid by the farmers and urban water users who benefit from the project, not taxpayers as a whole, and thus not requiring legislative or voter approval. However, an audit by the U.S. Department of the Interior released in September 2017 revealed that $50 million of the taxpayers' money was funneled into the project.

Background 

The precipitation in the northern part of the state, vital to the health of watersheds, fisheries, and communities in Northern California and often impacted by climate change and drought, has long been diverted<> to the arid southern portion of the state for agriculture and urban use. In the 1960s, Governor Pat Brown supported two large projects that reallocated water from the northern portion of the state to Southern California. In the early 1980s, his son and then Governor Jerry Brown attempted a third, the Peripheral Canal, which failed to gain voter support. Governor Arnold Schwarzenegger pushed for the project in 2009 and, after Jerry Brown's election as governor (again) in January 2011, Brown continued pushing the effort as one of his two main focuses during his eight years in office. During those years, the project morphed from an above-the-ground "peripheral canal" to two huge underground tunnels referred to as the "twin tunnels." The twin tunnel project was finally stopped in 2018 through the work of Delta citizens and support organizations. Governor Gavin Newsom began pushing for a single tunnel project when he took office in 2019.

Central Valley Project and State Water Project 

The Central Valley Project (CVP) is a federally owned and operated project completed in the 1970s. It has  of canals and moves up to 13 million acre feet per year and generates electricity—about half of which is used by the system. Overall, depending on the weather and amount of rain, up to 80% of water in the state is used for agriculture. Before the Central Valley Project Improvement Act (CVPIA) in 1992, the water transported from northern California went primarily to agriculture (90%), with the remaining 10% going to urban users.  The CVPIA required that 11% of the water go to environmental uses, with agriculture getting 79% of the water and urban users getting 10%.

The State Water Project (SWP) is owned and operated by the state and was conceived and supported in the late 1960s by Governor Edmund Pat Brown. The SWP has 700 miles of canals and can move 5.8 million acre feet of water per year. It uses more than twice the amount of electricity it generates. The water transported by the State Water Project is divided 75% for urban use and 25% for agriculture.

Peripheral Canal

When Governor Jerry Brown was previously in office, he championed an earlier version of the tunnels project called the Peripheral Canal. It would have transported water from near Sacramento around the Sacramento-San Joaquin Delta into the Central Valley Project and exported it to southern California. It was submitted to the voters for approval as a ballot referendum in 1982 but was turned down.

Bay Delta Conservation Plan

The Water Fix and Eco Restore project was previously called the Bay Delta Conservation Plan. When proposed in 2009, the project as originally conceived included both plans for building the tunnels and restoring the delta. The Bay Delta Conservation Plan included restoring  over a 50-year span. The US Fish and Wildlife Service said it would not issue permits for the plan because the state could not prove that the habitat restoration project would help the salmon, sturgeon, or delta smelt.

As a result, the Brown administration drastically reduced the habitat restoration plan and separated the water supply improvement plan, renaming it the Water Fix and Eco Restore project. The revised plan proposes short-term permits for each endangered species encountered. The Eco Restore project only attempts to restore  over five years at a cost of $300 million, funded with state bond money and other sources.

Responsible agencies 

Six agencies are responsible for funding the project. The Santa Clara Valley Water District  receives 40% of its water from both the SWP and CVP and serves 1.9 million residents of Silicon Valley. The  San Joaquin River Exchange Contractors Water Authority serves  and received 50% of its water from CVP in 2015. The San Luis & Delta-Mendota Water Authority is a wholesale water provider that delivers CVP largely to farmers covering  in 29 separate districts. It received no CVP water in 2014 and 2015. The Kern County Water Agency is a SWP contractor serving . It received 20% of its normal SWP allotment in 2015. The powerful Westlands Water District is the largest member of San Luis Authority.  The Metropolitan Water District of Southern California is a SWP contractor and one of the largest players in California water politics, serving 19 million urban residents. It is one of the tunnels' strongest supporters.

Water Fix 

The Water Fix project was proposed to address the issues of the water system infrastructure in California being "unreliable and outdated". The proposal also prepares for possible threats to the water system such as climate change and seismic activity.

Currently, water is exported from the Sacramento-San Joaquin Delta to the State Water Project and the Central Valley Project. The water flows through a maze of river channels and sloughs before entering the Clifton Court Forebay north of Tracy. From here, the Banks Pumping Plant pumps water into the California Aqueduct and the South Bay Aqueduct; the nearby C.W. Bill Jones Pumping Plant pumps water into the Delta-Mendota Canal. If not diverted, the water would flow into San Francisco Bay.

The Water Fix proposal includes two categories of construction: the north tunnels and the main tunnels. The north tunnels are three separate tunnels, each about 14 miles long, which connect the three intake facilities to the Intermediate Forebay (IF). The main tunnels are intended to connect the Intermediate Forebay to the Clifton Court Forebay.  These twin tunnels, depicted in the adjacent image, will be about 30 miles long. The main tunnels are also known as the twin tunnels, but are different from the Peripheral Canals proposed in 1982.  The Water Fix is intended to make conveyance of water for the State Water Project and Central Valley Project more reliable while relieving environmental pressure on the Delta area.

The proposal details the planning and construction of the project. It provides that the Department of Water Resources enters a contract with the project manager for the Water Fix and a program director will coordinate with the department. Managing the project would be a board of directors known as the "Authority Board", which would receive and review monthly status updates on the construction of the Water Fix. The "Authority Board" has a "Program Advisory Group" to advise board members, made up of technical experts from the Department of Water Resources. The director of the Department of Water Resources would have final control of all aspects of the project. To control and monitor each of the facilities the proposal includes a Supervisory Control and Data Acquisition (SCADA) system at each location which  can be controlled locally or remotely. The system would connect to the Delta Field Division Operations and Maintenance Center as well as to the Joint Operations Center in Sacramento.

Though the Water Fix proposal aims to resolve some issues with the California water system, there are many it does not address. The plan does not consider the possibility that there could be less flow in the Sacramento River, nor does it address how to allocate water to fisheries found in the Delta, some of which are already struggling because of current water exports from the Delta. There are also no plans to deal with the extreme subsidence that is happening in the Delta.

In May of 2019, the Department of Water Resources withdrew the proposed permits for the WaterFix project, conducting a new environmental review, and began the planning processes for a significantly smaller singular tunnel project that would replace the WaterFix project. This project will help prevent rising sea-levels and salt water from intruding in the Delta, giving the water supply more reliability while maintaining limited impacts on the communities and fish that rely on the Delta.

Eco Restore 

The Eco Restore plan is to mitigate the effects the California Water Fix will have on the environment either through construction or operation. Another item to note is that the Design and Construction Enterprise intends to get 2018b permits from the Department of Fish and Wildlife, this permit allows the incidental take of a species listed on the Endangered Species Act. 

Proposition 1 allocated $7.545 billion in general obligation bonds for water projects including surface and groundwater storage, ecosystem and watershed protection and restoration, and drinking water protection.

Restoration is viewed by ecologists as an important way to promote the recovery of an ecosystem. The adjacent table shows a page from the biological assessment which lists threatened and endangered species that have the potential of being affected by the implementation of the California Water Fix. The table shows that three species of threatened or endangered species of salmon, trout and sturgeon will likely be adversely affected by the project, one over a large area.

There are currently 12 environmental commitments that are included in the proposal for the Eco Restore. The Bay Delta Conservation Plan proposal before this included similar mitigation under the name of "conservation measures" and there were 21 of these measures; the 21 have been cut down to 12 measures and are now known as environmental commitments for the Eco Restore.  The environmental commitments are as follows:

Financing 

According to the Metropolitan Water District, southern California receives about 30 percent of its water supply from delta sources originating in snowmelt from the Sierra Nevada. In 2014, the state proposed that customers of the project would make billions of dollars in annual fixed payments, even during drought periods when water deliveries would drop or even cease. The state treasurer's office said the $25 billion financing plan would only be possible if water agencies adopted a set yearly payment plan. The State Treasurer's Office released a study in November 2014 conducted by consultants who found the project was feasible. According to the plan, the cities, water agencies—including an estimated 25 million residents—and farmers of 3 million acres, not taxpayers, would be responsible for the billions of dollars in debt over 50 years, even during dry years while receiving little or no water. The Metropolitan Water District has stated that the project will only cost each homeowner $5 a month, but it hasn't provided any analysis to support the figure. Critics say large projects like this tend to go over budget and the actual cost will be much higher.

Legislative and voter approval not required 

The state is planning to fund the project using bonds issued by the water agencies, not the state, which if successful would not require approval by the state legislature or a public vote. The study said the annual payment plan is required to sell revenue bonds at reasonable rates. But several of the agencies who would be required to pay for the construction project have stated they can't justify the costs if there's a chance they'll end up with less water. On November 8, 2016, California voters defeated Proposition 53, which would have required a public vote on any projects backed by state-issued revenue bonds over $2 billion, including the WaterFix project.

Westlands fine 

In March 2016, the Securities and Exchange Commission assessed a rare fine on Westlands in a settlement for misleading bond investors about the impact that the drought and water cuts had on its revenues. Their action raised concern about their ability to finance the WaterFix project.

Audit ordered 

After Westlands was fined for its questionable spending and accounting practices, the Joint Legislative Audit Committee in August 2016 requested an audit of the project by the California State Auditor. The audit started in April 2017 and took seven months to complete.
 In September 2017, the audit revealed that $50 million of the taxpayers' money was funneled into the project.

Comparable projects 

The size of the WaterFix project is as large or larger than English Channel Tunnel and Boston's Big Dig, both of which were significantly more costly than originally anticipated. The Channel Tunnel project at £4.65 billion (about USD$5.10 billion) was 80% over its predicted budget. The Boston highway project grew from an original estimate of $2.8 billion in 1982, and by December 2007 had risen to over $14.6 billion, a cost overrun of about 190% when adjusted for inflation. This was before a series of significant defects that resulted in several deaths were discovered. The Boston Globe estimated that the project will ultimately cost $22 billion, including interest, and that it would not be paid off until 2038.

Benefit-cost study 

In August 2016, a comprehensive benefit-cost analysis conducted by the University of the Pacific's Center for Business and Policy Research found that the project provided 23 cents in benefit for every dollar spent, or in the most optimistic scenario,
39 cents per dollar. Economist Jeffrey Michael, a professor of policy at the university, wrote that the project would deliver too little additional water for the cost. The study was funded by the Delta Counties Coalition, representing Contra Costa, Sacramento, San Joaquin, Solano, and Yolo county governments.

Legislation 

The application of the Eco Restore is not guaranteed because of a bill that has been introduced in the House and has currently been assigned to the House Appropriations committee. Bill H.R. 5055 makes it so there is a no funding for restoration along the San Joaquin River and it would make it so that pumping is mandated out of the Sacramento-San Joaquin Delta. If the bill is passed there will be no mitigation for the damage that may occur along the San Joaquin river or in the Delta due to the California Water Fix.

Another bill that may change the fate of the California Water Fix and Eco Restore is Assembly Bill 1713  If passed, it would require California voters to approve the Water Fix and Eco Restore.

Environmental impact

The basis for the project is that a new diversion system and extensive habitat restoration would improve delta conditions, boost the populations of imperiled fish, and ease limits on exports. Those who favor building the tunnels state that pumping water through the tunnels to the pumping plants would mitigate the problem of salt water intrusion into the delta, as the pumps would no longer pump directly from the delta. Proponents also believe that the project would protect the state's water system from the sea level rise expected to occur due to global warming. It would also "reinstate a more natural direction of river flows in the South Delta by 46–160 percent".

However, opponents note that some of the water that would normally flow into the delta is obligated under senior water rights to farmers in the delta. Opponents are concerned that the project will reduce the amount of freshwater flowing through the delta and cause worsening saltwater intrusion. Farmers in the delta are among the most opposed to the project because it would decrease the amount of water available to them for irrigation. The current federal and state delta water projects that fill the big aqueducts with water for southern California have altered natural water flow, causing the water in the estuary to run backward. They have disturbed the natural salinity patterns 

The flow of freshwater to the sea is about half of what it once was. To attempt to improve the quality of the bay's fresh water supply, the California State Water Resources Control Board has begun revising the fresh water standards which have not been updated since 1996. In September 2016, the board proposed rules that would allow up to 40 percent of the San Joaquin River watershed's water to flow through into the delta during the winter and spring months. Current rules allow the pumps to suck as much as 90 percent of the water from the river into the canals for Southern California's use.

Even though environmental regulations bar pumping under certain conditions, the pumping has pulled migrating fish away from their intended destinations. The formerly large populations of Delta smelt, Chinook salmon and other native fish have dropped to historically low levels. At least 35 native fish, plants and animal species have been added to federal and state endangered-species lists. The Delta smelt may be near extinction. State biologists conducted a study of Delta smelt in 2015, and found only six in the study area, where prior surveys netted hundreds.

The Water Fix plan does not provide any guarantee as to how much water the project would produce each year. When the Bay Conservation Development Plan was dropped, so was the 50-year plan. The current plan relies on a year-to-year environmental permits, which causes uncertainty about the plan's ability to fulfill its purpose.

Environmental groups are unanimously opposed to and/or have voiced strong concerns about the project, including national groups such as: the Center for Biological Diversity, National Resources Defense Council, Defenders of Wildlife, Endangered Species Coalition; state groups such as Friends of the River, California SportFishing Protection Alliance, Sierra Club CA, Planning and Conservation League, Restore the Delta, Environmental Protection Information Center, California Water Impact Network, Clean Water Action, Citizens Water Watch Environmental Justice Coalition for Water, and Pacific Coast Fed. of Fishermen's Associations; and regional groups such as The Bay Institute, Coalition to Save the California Delta, North Coast Rivers Alliance, Water4Fish, AquAlliance, and various Sierra Club chapters. Cities in and near the Delta and farmers in the delta are also opposed to the project because it would worsen the quality of water available for local municipal and agricultural uses.  The project would also require filling of 775 acres of wetlands and entail over a decade of construction.

Delta islands purchase 

The Metropolitan Water District of Southern California passed a measure to buy four delta islands for $175 million earlier in 2016, this buying of delta islands was  challenged by many organizations (including San Joaquin, North Coast Rivers Alliance, Pacific Coast Federation of Fishermen's Association), but a district court did decide that it was legal for the water district to purchase these islands because there are no negative impacts of their purchase as of yet.

References

External links 
 Bay Delta Conservation Plan
 The Bay Delta Conservation Plan: An Overview and Local Perspectives in Western City.
 Save the California Delta Alliance
 Bay-Delta Conservation from Save the Bay
 Restore the Delta
 Californians For A Fair Water Policy

Agriculture in California
Aqueducts in California
Irrigation in the United States
San Joaquin Valley
Sacramento River
Transportation buildings and structures in Sacramento County, California
Sacramento–San Joaquin River Delta
Central Valley Project
Politics of California
Canals in California
Central Valley (California)
Water in California
Jerry Brown